Harry Carvelery Hinton (8 January 1857 – 16 April 1948) was an industrialist of British origin and a football pioneer who is widely regarded as one of the most important figures in the amateur beginnings of football in Portugal, organizing the first-ever football game in the country in 1875. He also owned the Fábrica do Torreão.

Early life
Harry Hinton was born in 1857, as the son of William Hinton (1817–1904). He studied in London, but he would spend the summers in Camacha, where his main hobby was playing a sport practically unknown in Portugal at the time called football, and according to the chronicles, it was Hinton who in the summer of 1875, brought the first ball of football from England to the island. The 18-year-old Hinton then organized the first-ever football match in Portugal at the Largo da Achada, which was played by British only. However, he might have taught young Madeirans how to play the game as well. At the time, in Funchal, people from the seaside had already disputed some football games with the crew of English ships who would dock at the port of Funchal.

Death
Hinton died on 16 April 1948 at the age of 91.

He was awarded the Order of Christ and the Agricultural and the Industrial Order of Merit.

Legacy
Today there is a small football field in Largo da Achada in homage to the place which provided the launch pad for football in Portugal by Hinton.

References

1857 births
1948 deaths
Members of the Congress of Deputies of the Spanish Restoration
Members of the Senate of Spain
Mayors of Madrid
Madrid city councillors